North Walsham railway station (formerly known as North Walsham Main) is on the Bittern Line in Norfolk, England, serving the town of North Walsham.

The station is managed by Greater Anglia, which also operates all passenger trains that call.

Description
North Walsham Town closed on 28 February 1959, with the "Main" station renamed simply "North Walsham".

In 2010 the station signs were changed to read "North Walsham, home of Paston College".

The station is the site of the only passing loop on the route (although trains can also pass in the station at ), which has been worked remotely from Norwich since the line was re-signalled in 2000. Aggregate traffic (in the form of spent railway ballast) has also been handled here in the past.

Services

Trains run hourly between Norwich and Sheringham. 
There are fewer services on Sundays, which alternate every hour between a stopping service (calling at all stations) and a semi-fast service that only calls at Cromer and Hoveton & Wroxham.

References

External links 

 The Bittern Line official website
 North Walsham station (the south west one of the pair of stations) on navigable 1946 O. S. map

Railway stations in Norfolk
DfT Category F1 stations
Former Great Eastern Railway stations
Railway stations in Great Britain opened in 1874
Greater Anglia franchise railway stations
North Walsham